The decade of the 1220s in art involved some significant events.

Events

Works

 1229: Catalan School completes James I the Conqueror Besieging Palma, Majorca
 1229: The illuminated manuscript Codex Gigas is completed
 1227: Anonymous stained glass north transept rose window and lancets at Chartres Cathedral completed
 c. 1225–29?: Bamberg Horseman carved at Bamberg Cathedral
 1225: Shrine of the Three Kings at Cologne Cathedral completed by Nicholas of Verdun
 1220: Unknown Kei school sculptor completes Thousand-armed Avalokiteśvara statue in Kōfuku-ji
 c. 1220s: Xia Gui paints Willows and Boats on West Lakes

Births
1220/1225: Nicola Pisano – Italian sculptor whose work is noted for its classical Roman sculptural style (died 1284)
1222: Gong Kai Chinese government official and later scholar-amateur painter (died 1307)
1225: Coppo di Marcovaldo – Italian painter (died 1276)
1225: Deodato Cosmati – Roman architect and sculptor, and worker in decorative geometric mosaic (died 1303)

Deaths
 1223: Unkei – Japanese sculptor (born 1151)
 1224: Liu Songnian – Song Dynasty Chinese artist (born 1174)
 1225: Xia Gui – Chinese scroll painter of the Song Dynasty, great master of the Southern Song landscape style (born 1195)
 1225: Ma Yuan – Chinese painter of the Song Dynasty, of the Ma-Xia school of painting (born 1160–65)

 
Years of the 13th century in art
Art